The Country Lasses: or, The Custom of the Manor is a 1715 comedy play by the British writer Charles Johnson.

The original Drury Lane cast included Robert Wilks as Modely, Barton Booth as Heartwell, John Mills as Freehold, Benjamin Johnson as Sir John English, Joe Miller as Sneak, Richard Cross as Carbuncle, Henry Norris as Tim Shacklefigure, James Quin as Vulture, Susanna Mountfort as Flora, Hester Santlow as Aura. The play was dedicated to Thomas Pelham, Earl of Clare, a Whig politician and patron of the arts.

It was a popular success and remained in the repertoire for the next century.

References

Bibliography
 Burling, William J. A Checklist of New Plays and Entertainments on the London Stage, 1700-1737. Fairleigh Dickinson Univ Press, 1992.
 Nicoll, Allardyce. History of English Drama, 1660-1900, Volume 2. Cambridge University Press, 2009.
 Orr, Bridget. British Enlightenment Theatre: Dramatizing Difference. Cambridge University Press, 2020.

1715 plays
West End plays
Plays by Charles Johnson
Comedy plays